Virginia Brown Faire (born Virginia Cecelia Labuna; June 26, 1904 – June 30, 1980) was an American silent film actress, appearing in dramatic films and, later, in sound westerns.

Early years
Virginia Cecelia Labuna was born in Brooklyn, New York, the daughter of Joseph Labuna and Martha Delsand. Other sources have her last name as La Buna. She attended Wadleigh High School for Girls.

She was brought to Hollywood in 1919 after being one of the four winners of the Motion Picture Classic magazine's "Fame and Fortune" contest, which she had entered as Virginia Brown, using her stepfather's last name.

Film
Not long after she turned 15 years old that she presented herself at the Metro studio where she was almost immediately put on. Shortly after she appeared in pictures for Fox, she was with Universal. Between 1920 and 1935, she appeared in some 75 films. Her first film credit was the 1920 film Runnin' Straight, a Hoot Gibson short western at Universal. Faire was the leading lady of John Gilbert in Monte Cristo (1922). She was selected as one of the WAMPAS Baby Stars in 1923 and appeared with Wallace and Noah Beery in Stormswept that same year. She is most remembered for her role as Tinker Bell in the 1924 film Peter Pan.

In 1926 she had a small role in the Greta Garbo film The Temptress. She made it through the transition of sound, making a successful talkie in Frank Capra's The Donovan Affair (1929), but was soon appearing in more low-budget films. Faire appeared in several westerns, opposite Hoot Gibson, Buck Jones, John Wayne and Ken Maynard. Faire left Hollywood for Chicago, Illinois in the late 1930s. She worked in radio and several films for industries prior to retiring to the west coast.

Personal life
Faire married actor Jack Dougherty on February 6, 1927. They separated in September of that year and reconciled briefly, but they separated again by April 5, 1928, and she filed for divorce on June 22, 1928.

She married director Duke Worne on January 29, 1930. Worne died in 1933. In 1935, she married furniture manufacturer William Bayer, and they remained wed until her death.

Death
Faire died of cancer on June 30, 1980 in Laguna Beach, California, aged 76.

Selected filmography

 Runnin' Straight (1920)
 Masked (1920)
 Without Benefit of Clergy (1921)
 Fightin' Mad (1921)
 Monte Cristo (1922)
 Omar the Tentmaker (1922) *unknown/presumably lost film
 Vengeance of the Deep (1923) *lost film
 Shadows of the North (1923) *lost film
 Thundergate (1923)
 Stormswept (1923)
 Romance Ranch (1924)
 The Lightning Rider (1924)
 Welcome Stranger (1924) *lost film
 Peter Pan (1924)
 The Lost World (1925)
 Friendly Enemies (1925)
 The Thoroughbred (1925)
 The Calgary Stampede (1925)
 His People (1925)
 Recompense (1925) *lost film
 Chip of the Flying U (1926)
 Wings of the Storm (1926)
 The Mile-a-Minute Man (1926)
 The Wolf Hunters (1926)
 Frenzied Flames (1926)
 Racing Romance (1926)
 The Temptress (1926)
 Broadway Billy (1926)
 Pleasure Before Business (1927)
 Hazardous Valley (1927)
Queen of the Chorus (1928)
 A Race for Life (1928)
 The Chorus Kid (1928) *lost film
 Undressed (1928) *lost film
 The House of Shame (1928)
 Danger Patrol (1928)
 The Canyon of Adventure (1928)
 Burning the Wind (1928) *lost film
 The Devil's Chaplain (1929)
 The Body Punch (1929)
 Handcuffed (1929)
 Untamed Justice (1929)
 The Donovan Affair (1929) *film survives, but soundtrack is lost
 Murder on the Roof (1930)
 The Lonesome Trail (1930)
 Breed of the West (1930)
 The Last Ride (1931)
 Alias – the Bad Man (1931)
 Hell's Valley (1931)
 Secret Menace (1931)
 West of the Divide (1934)

References

External links

 
 

1904 births
1980 deaths
American film actresses
American radio actresses
American silent film actresses
Actresses from New York City
Actresses from Hollywood, Los Angeles
20th-century American actresses
People from Brooklyn
WAMPAS Baby Stars
Western (genre) film actresses